Helen Cohan (September 13, 1910 – September 14, 1996) was an American stage dancer and briefly a Hollywood film actress. She was the youngest daughter of vaudeville and Broadway legend George M. Cohan. She was born in New York City and studied at Marymount College in Tarrytown, New York and in France.

At the age of 17 Helen appeared as a dancer at New York's Heckscher Theatre in the 1928 Dance Recital produced by Ned Wayburn. Her first appearance on the stage came during the run of The Merry Malones at Erlanger's Theatre. She danced with her father for one performance. In 1931, she joined her dad in his play Fast Friendships. The previous season, she played in the Kaufman-Lardner comedy June Moon. Miss Cohan spent five months in Hollywood hoping to break into motion pictures and then was signed to a contract by Fox Film in 1930. Her film credits are few; she had roles in Kiss and Make-Up (1934), The Penal Code (1932), and Lightnin' (1930). The latter movie featured Will Rogers.

She was listed by the WAMPAS Organization of film publicity men as one of 33 young actresses nominated for its annual selection of 13 Baby Stars in March 1934. She once provided a beauty hint which was syndicated in 1936 newspapers. Helen suggested giving one's skin a rest from make-up whenever possible: "During the hours at home, cleanse the face thoroughly and then let the pores breath. Do this as faithfully as you do your morning exercises."

In August 1931, Edward Wallace Dunn left his entire estate of $5,000 to Helen Cohan. Dunn was employed as personal representative to her father during the final 25 years of his life. Miss Cohan was listed as residing at the Hotel Savoy Plaza in New York. The will was dated October 5, 1929. Dunn died at age 74. 

Upon his death on November 5, 1942, Cohan divided his estate equally among his widow and four children. The will, dated March 2, 1939, stated that the beneficiaries were to receive the principal of their trust funds in installments at specified ages, and under the codicil, if the income of any trust falls below $100 a month, the deficit may be made up out of the principal.

Death
Helen Cohan died in Los Angeles, California on the day after her 86th birthday in 1996.

References
 Albert Lea Evening Tribune, "My Beauty Hint", Friday, August 10, 1936, Page 6.
 New York Times, "Helen Cohan to Appear as a Dancer", June 9, 1928, Page 9.
 New York Times, "Cohan's Daughter to Act in His Play", April 9, 1931, Page 34.
 New York Times, "E.W. Dunn Estate to Helen Cohan", August 19, 1931, Page 42.
 New York Times, "Wampas to Produce Baby Star Movies", March 15, 1934, Page 26.
 New York Times, "Widow and Children Share Cohan Estate", November 11, 1942, Page 22.
 Syracuse Herald, "Helen Cohan to Play in Talkies", Wednesday Evening, July 2, 1930, Page 11.

External links

Actresses from New York City
American film actresses
American female dancers
Dancers from New York (state)
20th-century American actresses
American expatriates in France
Helen
1910 births
1996 deaths
WAMPAS Baby Stars